Hertfordshire County Cricket Club played in List A cricket matches between 1964 and 2003. This is a list of the players who appeared in those matches.

Stuart Ambrose (1974–1976): SR Ambrose
Steve Andrew (1999–2000): SJW Andrew
John Appleyard (1966–1974): JD Appleyard
Andy Armstrong (2002): A Armstrong
Alan Bell (1966): TA Bell
Ian Beven (1981): IR Beven
Donald Bick (1971): DA Bick
Stuart Boon (1964): SB Boon
Bob Broadbent (1964): RG Broadbent
Alan Burridge (1976–1977): AJ Burridge
Stephen Burrow (1999–2000): S Burrow
Gary Butcher (2003): GP Butcher
John Carr (1991): JD Carr
Cliff Cavener (1993–2001): CN Cavener
Laurie Clough (1964–1971): TL Clough
Brian Collins (1969–1987): BG Collins
Francis Collyer (1969–1986): FE Collyer
Lenny Cooper (2001): LMG Cooper
Steve Cordingley (2001–2003): SG Cordingley
Stuart Cradock (1976): S Cradock
Tom Cranston (2001): TP Cranston
John Cundle (1964): JWJ Cundle
Alan Day (1966–1974): AR Day
Stephen Dean (1983–1987): SA Dean
Christopher Debenham (1977): CJ Debenham
Dilip Doshi (1976): DR Doshi
Micky Dunn (1971–1981): MT Dunn
Richard Ellis (1993): RGP Ellis
Justin Engelke (2000): JM Engelke
Brian Evans (1983–1991): BG Evans
David Evans (1969): DJ Evans
Matthew Evans (1999–2002): MR Evans
Mark Everett (1999–2002): MA Everett
Jonathan Fellows-Smith (1966): JP Fellows-Smith
Iain Fletcher (1990–2003): I Fletcher
Ben Frazer (2001–2003): BJ Frazer
Robin Gardner (1964–1966): LR Gardner
Alan Garofall (1971–1989): AR Garofall
Nicholas Gilbert (1984–1999): N Gilbert
Neil Gladwin (2001): N Gladwin
Mark Gouldstone (1993): MR Gouldstone
Andy Griffin (1999–2000): AD Griffin
Robert Hailey (1983–1988): RJ Hailey
Gordon Harris (1990–1993): GAR Harris
Jonathon Harvey (1993): JD Harvey
Steve Henderson (1987–1989): SP Henderson
Reuben Herbert (1987): R Herbert
Basil Hollington (1971–1974): HB Hollington
David Hughes (1999–2000): ND Hughes
John Iberson (1964–1966): J Iberson
Nigel Ilott (1993): NJ Ilott
Martin James (1993–2002): MH James
Richard Jerome (2000): RS Jerome
Robin Johns (1976–1983): RL Johns
Ian Jones (1969): CIM Jones
Kafeel Jahangir (1993–2000): Kafeel Jahangir
Ronnie Kotkamp (2002): R Kotkamp
Derek Lane (1999): DM Lane
Andy Lewis (2003): AS Lewis
David Ligertwood (1991): DGC Ligertwood
David Lowe (2001): D Lowe
Stephen Lowe (2001): SJ Lowe
Neil MacLaurin (1989–1991): NRC MacLaurin
Kervin Marc (2002): K Marc
Robin Marques (1964–1966): CVL Marques
Bill Merry (1977–1991): WG Merry
Andrew Miller (1988): AJT Miller
Jamie Murch (2003): JCT Murch
Peter Neal (1981–1988): EP Neal
Andrew Needham (1989–1991): A Needham
Martin Olley (1985–1989): MWC Olley
Luke O'Reilly (1999): LJ O'Reilly
Paul O'Reilly (2001–2002): PJ O'Reilly
Wayne Osman (1974–1986): WM Osman
David Ottley (1976–1986): DG Ottley
Tom Pearman (2003): TJ Pearman
Bob Pomphrey (1974–1981): RH Pomphrey
Scott Ruskin (2001): SN Ruskin
Robert Simons (1964–1966): RG Simons
Tony Skeggs (2003): AE Skeggs
David Smith (1989–1991): DM Smith
Geoff Smith (1969): GJ Smith
Matthew Smith (2001): ME Smith
Tim Smith (1983–1990): TS Smith
Len Stubbs (1969–1971): LG Stubbs
David Surridge (1983–1993): D Surridge
Steven Sylvester (1999–2000): SA Sylvester
Chris Thomas (1983): C Thomas
Henry Tilly (1964–1971): HW Tilly
Neil Vartan (1990): RNR Vartan
Michael Voss (1991): MF Voss
Roy Wacey (1964–1976): RH Wacey
Nick Walker (2001–2003): NGE Walker
Matthew Walshe (1993): MJ Walshe
David Ward (1999–2003): DM Ward
Simon White (2001–2003): SP White
James Wright (1974–1981): JDW Wright
Lawrence Wright (1964): LW Wright
Martin Wright (1986–1989): MCG Wright
Nick Wright (1983–1991): NPG Wright

References

Hertfordshire County Cricket Club